Cnemaspis stongensis is a species of gecko from Gunung Stong, Kelantan, Malaysia.

References

Further reading
Amarasinghe, AA Thasun, et al. "A New Species of Cnemaspis (Reptilia: Gekkonidae) from Sumatra, Indonesia." Herpetologica 71.2 (2015): 160–167.

Cnemaspis
Endemic fauna of Malaysia
Reptiles of Malaysia
Reptiles described in 2014